Yor Anei (born December 7, 1999) is an American basketball player who currently plays college basketball for  DePaul. He previously played for SMU and Oklahoma State.

High school career
Anei started off his high school career at Shawnee Mission South in Overland Park. He was a standout in his junior year and caught the eye of many recruiters. In his senior year, he joined Lee's Summit West where he was vital in helping the Titans earn a 22–5 record along with a Missouri Suburban Gold Conference championship. At the end of the season Anei was selected to the 2018 Missouri vs Kansas All-Star game where he would help Missouri to win 114–92, in the game he grabbed 15 points and 4 assists. Anei was named the number 1 player in Kansas regardless of position and the number 56 power forward in the country.

Anei played AAU Basketball for Team Rush in Kansas City. Team Rush was coached by former Oklahoma State Cowboy, Victor Williams.

Recruiting
Anei received attention from multiple schools, such as Oklahoma State, UAB, and Denver.

College career

Oklahoma State
As a freshman at Oklahoma State Anei averaged 7.7 points and 5 rebounds, along with being an elite blocker on the national stage. He tied for 8th in the NCAA for blocks and 2nd in Freshman. He also tied Andre Williams' Oklahoma State school block record of 85. He had his first career double-double against TCU with 17 points and 10 rebounds, in that game he also had 7 blocks, which was only one away from the Big 12 record.  In his sophomore season, Anei averaged 8.1 points, 4.6 rebounds and 1.9 blocks per game. Anei also recorded 13 double-digit scoring performances, in which Oklahoma State was 13–0 in those games. He had 8 blocks against Oral Roberts which was the most by any Big 12 player.

SMU
On July 15, 2020, Anei announced his transfer to SMU following OSU's one-year postseason ban from the NCAA. In his Junior season, and his first with SMU, he averaged 6.6 points, 2.2 rebounds, and 2.2 blocked shots. He lead the American Athletic Conference in blocked shots. He had 12 points and 4 blocks in a win against UCF and 15 points along with 5 blocks in a win against Temple.

DePaul
On August 11, 2021, DePaul head coach Tony Stubblefield announced Anei's transfer to their program. In his senior season with DePaul, Anei averaged 4.6 points and 4.1 rebounds. Anei also recorded 49 blocks on the season. Anei ranked top among blocks in the Big East, Anei joined with Nick Ongenda as the first duo to reach 40 blocks in program history.

Career statistics

College

|-
| style="text-align:left;"| 2018–19
| style="text-align:left;"| Oklahoma State
| 32 || 29 || 23.5 || .616 || .000 || .641 || 4.8 || .7 || .3 || 2.7 || 7.7
|-
| style="text-align:left;"| 2019–20
| style="text-align:left;"| Oklahoma State
| 32 || 26 || 20.3 || .484 || .333 || .704 || 4.7 || .5 || .6 || 1.9 || 8.1
|-
| style="text-align:left;"| 2020–21
| style="text-align:left;"| SMU
| 11 || 1 || 17.4 || .587 || .143 || .750 || 2.2 || .3 || .5 || 2.2 || 6.6
|-
| style="text-align:left;"| 2021–22
| style="text-align:left;"| DePaul
| 30 || 4 || 15.4 || .550 || .000 || .707 || 4.1 || .4 || .6 || 1.6 || 4.6
|-
| style="text-align:left;"| 2022–23
| style="text-align:left;"| DePaul
| 18 || 16 || 18.0 || .433 || .000 || .640 || 3.8 || .9 || .8 || 1.3 || 5.2
|- class="sortbottom"
| style="text-align:center;" colspan="2"| Career
|| 123 || 76 || 19.3 || .532 || .083 || .685 || 4.2 || .6 || .5 || 2.0 || 6.6

Stats are updated as of March 4, 2023.

Personal life
Anei's mother, Kathleen Akot was a South Sudanese refugee when she fled to the United States to leave the war-torn South Sudan, where she went to Overland Park and gave birth to Anei. His mother had to work long and late shifts to support her and Anei. So in 2017, Anei was legally adopted by the parents of his high school teammate, Christian Bishop, the bishops were able to help Anei achieve his academic and athletic goals and supported him for his senior year.

Anei lost his right index and middle fingers in a blender accident as a young kid.

References

External links
 
  DePaul Blue Demons bio
  SMU Mustangs bio
  Oklahoma State Cowboys bio

1999 births
Living people
American men's basketball players
Basketball players from Kansas
Sportspeople from Overland Park, Kansas
Power forwards (basketball)
DePaul Blue Demons men's basketball players
SMU Mustangs men's basketball players
Oklahoma State Cowboys basketball players